Place 54 (pronunciation: PLAHS cen-KAHNT KAHTR as it is a French-language title) is the third studio album by Nantes-based rap group Hocus Pocus, released in 2007.  The album title refers to a seat in a passenger train car.

Some of the tracks feature other artists such as Malik Mezzadri ("Quitte á t'aimer"), Omar ("Smile"), Fred Wesley and Stro the 89th Key ("Recyclé"), T-Love & The Procussions ("Vocab!"), Dalja and C2C ("Move On"), Elodie Rama and Tribeqa ("Touriste"), and Taïriq Keda, who produced "Je la Soul".  The track "Quitte á t'aimer" is a re-recording of a song from Cesária Évora, a Cape Verdean artist, from her 1995 album Cesária.

Translations of song titles include "Quitte á t'aimer" (At the risk of loving you), "Recyclé" (recycled), "Tournée" (tour), "Touriste" (tourist), "Histoire d'une VHS" (story of a VHS tape), and "Voyage immobile" (unmoving trip).

Track listing

Accolades
The album was nominated under the category Best Urban Music Album at the 2008 Victoires de la Musique.

References

External links
 
 

2007 albums